Balut-e Asadi (also Romanized as Balūţ-e Asadī and Balūţ Asadī) is a village in Poshtkuh-e Rostam Rural District, Sorna District, Rostam County, Fars Province, Iran. At the 2006 census, its population was 120, in 24 families.

References 

Populated places in Rostam County